is a Japanese boxer. He competed in the men's light flyweight event at the 1968 Summer Olympics. At the 1968 Summer Olympics, he lost to Viktor Zaporozhets of the Soviet Union.

References

1944 births
Living people
Japanese male boxers
Olympic boxers of Japan
Boxers at the 1968 Summer Olympics
Sportspeople from Akita Prefecture
Light-flyweight boxers